Brother Mel Meyer (June 5, 1928 – October 12, 2013) was an artist who created an estimated 10,000 pieces of art during his career. 
He was a Marianist brother based out of Missouri.

Early life and education
Meyer was the fourth of seven children in his home and the only one to become a religious brother. His sister was Rita Meyer (baseball). He was raised in Old Town Florissant, a suburb of St. Louis, by his parents, Harry and Margaret Meyer. He graduated from McBride High School, taught by members of the Marianist order. He entered the order in 1947 and took his final vows in 1952. He completed his undergraduate studies at the University of Dayton in Ohio. He taught religion and social studies at Central Catholic High School in San Antonio in the early 1950s. He completed his master's degree at Notre Dame in art in 1960.

Works
His work included metal sculptures, watercolors, stained glass, frescoes and acrylic on canvas paintings. He worked, as well, with handmade paper and textiles. He did much of his work at his studio on the campus at Vianney High School which he opened in 1969.

Awards and honors
Brother Mel was awarded an honorary PhD from St. Louis University. There is a sculpture garden in St. Louis devoted exclusively to his work. A book about his life, "Brother Mel: A Lifetime of Making Art,” was published in 2009.

Artist's philosophy
“Art is an outgrowth of what the person is," said Meyer. "I’m a happy person. The feeling of being happy finds its way into the art.”

Death
Brother Mel died on October 12, 2013 at the Marianist community residence on the campus of St. John Vianney High School in Kirkwood, Mo., of complications of heart disease. He was 85. Survivors include two sisters, Elsi Pondrom and Audrey Smith, and a brother, Gilbert Meyer.

References

American artists
Catholic sculptors
American male sculptors
Sculptors from Missouri
20th-century American sculptors
21st-century American sculptors
University of Dayton alumni
1928 births
2013 deaths